Karate competitions at the 2019 European Games in Minsk were held on 29 and 30 June 2019 at the Čyžoŭka-Arena. The competition consisted of twelve events, six in each gender – two kata or technique events, and ten weighted kumite or combat events.

Qualification

Medalists

Men

Women

Medal table

References

External links
Official website
Medallists by Event

 
Sports at the 2019 European Games
2019
European Games